A civil marriage is a marriage performed, recorded, and recognized by a government official. Such a marriage may be performed by a religious body and recognized by the state, or it may be entirely secular.

History
Every country maintaining a population registry of its residents keeps track of marital status, and all UN Member countries except Iran, Somalia, South Sudan, Sudan, and Tonga have signed or ratified either the United Nations Convention on Consent to Marriage, Minimum Age for Marriage, and Registration of Marriages (1962) or the United Nations Convention on the Elimination of All Forms of Discrimination against Women (1979) which carry a responsibility to register marriages. Most countries define the conditions of civil marriage separately from religious requirements. Certain countries, such as Israel, allow couples to register only on the condition that they have first been married in a religious ceremony recognized by the state, or were married in a different country.

In England
In medieval Europe, marriage was governed by canon law, which recognized as valid only those marriages where the parties stated they took one another as husband and wife, regardless of the presence or absence of witnesses. It was not necessary, however, to be married by any official or cleric. This institution was canceled in England with the enactment of "Lord Hardwicke's Marriage Act" of 1753, which required that, in order to be valid and registered, all marriages were to be performed in an official ceremony in a religious setting recognized by the state, i.e. Church of England, the Quakers, or in a Jewish ceremony. Any other form of marriage was abolished. Children born into unions that were not valid under the Act would not automatically inherit the property or titles of their parents. For historical reasons, the Act did not apply in Scotland. Consequently, until 1940, it continued to be enough in Scotland for a man and a woman to pledge their commitment to each other in front of witnesses to legalize their marriage. This led to an industry of "fast marriages" in Scottish towns on the border with England; the town of Gretna Green was particularly well known for this. In 1836, the requirement that the ceremony takes place in a religious forum was removed, and registrars have given the authority to register marriages not conducted by a religious official.

In other European countries

Many European countries had institutions similar to common-law marriage. However, The Catholic Church forbade clandestine marriage at the Fourth Lateran Council (1215), which required all marriages to be announced in a church by a priest. In 1566, the edict of the Council of Trent was proclaimed denying Catholics any form of marriage not executed in a religious ceremony before a priest and two witnesses.

The Protestant pastor and theologian of Geneva, John Calvin, decreed that in order for a couple to be considered married they must be registered by the state in addition to a church ceremony.

In 1792, with the French Revolution, religious marriage ceremonies in France were made secondary to civil marriage.  Religious ceremonies could still be performed, but only for couples who had already been married in a civil ceremony. Napoleon later spread this custom throughout most of Europe. In present-day France, only civil marriage has legal validity. A religious ceremony may be performed after or before the civil union, but it has no legal effect.

In Germany, the Napoleonic code was valid only in territories conquered by Napoleon. With the fall of his empire, civil marriage in Germany began to die out. However, certain sovereign German states introduced civil marriages, which were either obligatory (like the French model) or optional, with either a religious or civil ceremony being accepted. Already before 1848, the Grand-Duchy of Saxe-Weimar-Eisenach enacted optional civil marriages, followed by the German republics of  the Free City of Frankfurt upon Main (1850, obligatory), Free and Hanseatic City of Hamburg (1851, optional) and Free and Hanseatic City of Lübeck (1852, optional). German Grand-Duchies such as Oldenburg (1852/55, optional), Baden (1860), and Hesse (1860) as well as the Kingdom of Württemberg (1863) followed suit. Civil marriages enabled interfaith marriages as well as marriages between spouses of different Christian denominations.  After the unification of Germany in 1871, the Reichstag adopted a bill initiated by Chancellor Otto von Bismarck as the "Civil Marriage Law" in 1875 (see: Kulturkampf); since then, only civil marriages have been recognized in Germany. Religious ceremonies may still be performed at the couple's discretion. Until December 31, 2008, religious marriages could not be performed until the couple had first married in a civil ceremony.

Civil marriage in the world currently

England and Wales

Today marriages in England or Wales must be held in authorized premises, which may include register offices, premises such as stately homes, castles, and hotels that have been approved by the local authority, churches or chapels of the Church of England or Church in Wales, and other churches and religious premises that have been registered by the registrar general for marriage.

Civil marriages require a certificate and at times a license, that testify that the couple is fit for marriage.  A short time after they are approved in the superintendent registrar's office, a short non-religious ceremony takes place which the registrar, the couple, and two witnesses must attend; guests may also be present. Reference must not be made to God or any deity, or to a particular religion or denomination: this is strictly enforced, and readings and music in the ceremony must be agreed upon in advance.

United States
Marriage in the United States is largely regulated by state laws, though the Supreme Court has the authority to strike down unconstitutional laws — see cases Loving v. Virginia and Obergefell v. Hodges.

All states and the District of Columbia, as well as U.S. Territories, require a marriage license issued by local civil authorities. As a rule, ministers of religion (e.g. rabbis or Christian pastors) are authorized in law to perform marriages; various state or local officials, such as a mayor, judge, deputy marriage commissioner, or justice of the peace, are also empowered to conduct civil wedding ceremonies, which may take place in public offices. Many counties in Pennsylvania allow self-uniting marriages for which no official minister is required, owing to the state's Quaker heritage. The type of ceremony (religious or civil) has no bearing on the legal validity of the marriage, and there is no requirement to precede a religious rite with a civil ceremony. Marriages performed outside of the United States are legally binding if officially recognized by the government of the country in which they are performed.

Countries with mandatory civil marriage
In most European and Latin American countries there is a civil ceremony requirement.  Following the civil marriage ceremony, couples are free to marry in a religious ceremony.  Such ceremonies, however, only serve to provide a religious recognition of the marriage, since the state's recognition has already been given. In some of these countries (e.g. Belgium, the Netherlands and Turkey) most couples marry without any religious ceremony at all. Full, formal weddings, complete with wedding gowns and the presence of family and friends, are usually conducted in special ceremonial rooms in the town hall.

Countries with no civil marriage
There is no civil marriage in many Middle Eastern countries like Egypt, Syria, Jordan, Saudi Arabia, Qatar, Yemen, Iran, Lebanon, and Israel, as well as Libya, Mauritania, and Indonesia, among others; all marriages are conducted by religious authorities, and are registered by civil authorities only after having been registered by authorities of officially approved religions, or, having been registered abroad. Some of those countries as Israel, Syria, and Lebanon officially recognize Islam, Christianity, Druze, Judaism, and marriage are possible but usually only within the same community. Contrary to the situation in Lebanon, Syrian law prohibits the recognition of any marriage that falls outside the existing proscriptions of its personal status laws, even if the couple marries abroad. Egypt recognizes civil marriages but is very complicated. One needs to complete all necessary paperwork and then one must go with two men as one's witnesses. Foreigners will need a paper from their embassy. This yields particular problems for those refused divorce by their spouses, or couples in religious traditions that forbid divorce altogether. Malaysia and Abu Dhabi, the capital city of United Arab Emirates, allows civil marriage for non-Muslims only, while in Kuwait, Bahrain and Afghanistan it is allowed for foreign citizens only.

Civil marriage and other unions of same-sex couples

, the following jurisdictions permit same-sex marriages:
 Argentina
 Australia
 Austria
 Belgium
 Brazil
 Canada
 Chile
 Costa Rica
 Colombia
 Cuba
 Denmark
 Ecuador
 Finland
 France
 Germany
 Iceland
 Ireland
 Luxembourg
 Malta
 Mexico
 Netherlands
 New Zealand
 Norway
 Portugal
 Slovenia
 South Africa
 Spain
 Sweden
 Taiwan
 United Kingdom 
 United States
 Uruguay
 Israel recognizes same-sex marriage performed abroad 
 Armenia recognizes same-sex marriage performed abroad

In 22 countries worldwide and in several jurisdictions within Mexico, a same-sex couple can be legally partnered in a civil union, domestic partnership or registered partnership. Couples in these unions or partnerships are afforded rights and obligations similar to, but not identical to, those of a married couple.

See also
Civil union
Common-law marriage
Domestic partnership
Same-sex marriage

Notes

References

Bibliography

External links
 

Family law
Types of marriage